John M. Reilly (born January 31, 1958) is a former Republican member of the Michigan House of Representatives.

Reilly is the owner of Log Cabin Handyman, a home services business. As state representative, Reilly has sponsored a bill that would eliminate Michigan state requirements for concealed pistol training. Reilly is Catholic.

On October 10, 2021, Reilly co-sponsored House Bill 5444 also known as the "fetal heartbeat protection act."

References

External links 
 John Reilly at gophouse.org
 John Reilly at ballotpedia.org

Living people
1958 births
Catholics from Michigan
Oakland Community College alumni
Republican Party members of the Michigan House of Representatives
21st-century American politicians